Télé Sahel is the national broadcaster of the West African state of Niger. Owned and operated by the government Office of Radio and Television of Niger, which also operates Radio Voix du Sahel and the TAL TV satellite station, Télé Sahel provides news and other programs in French and several local languages.  Its stations transmit to all urban centers.  Founded in 1964, its current Director General is Moussa Saley.

The state ORTN network depends financially on the government, partly through an addition to electricity bills and partly through direct subsidy. The High Council for Communication also maintains a fund which supports private broadcasters, although its payments are criticised as political and irregular.

See also
Media of Niger

References

Media in Niger: the African Development Information Database.
Medias Status Report:Niger. Summary document written for the African Media Partners Network. Guy-Michel Boluvi, Les Echos du Sahel Niamey. (January 2001).
Addo Mahamane. Enjeux et ambivalence de la liberté de la presse dans le contexte démocratique africain : l’exemple du Niger entre 1990 et 2008. Paper presented at the CODESRIA 12th General Assembly, Yaoundé, Cameroun (07-11/12/2008).
Marie-Soleil Frere. NEW PRIVATE MEDIA IN FRENCH-SPEAKING WEST AFRICAN COUNTRIES : PROBLEMS AND PROSPECTS The Cases of Benin and Niger. Afrika Focus, Vol. 12, Nr. 1-2-3, 1996, pp. 85–117

External links
Official site

Television stations in Niger
Publicly funded broadcasters
Broadcasting companies of Niger
Television channels and stations established in 1964
State media
1964 establishments in Niger